Abronia turbinata is a species of flowering plant in the four o'clock family known by the common name transmontane sand-verbena. It is native to eastern California and Oregon and western Nevada, where it grows in desert and plateau scrub.

This is an erect or spreading herb, usually an annual, approaching 50 centimeters in maximum stem height or length. It produces several thick green leaves which are somewhat oval to nearly round and a few centimeters wide. Inflorescences arise from the stem on peduncles of several centimeters and hold hemispheric or spreading clusters of up to 35 white to pinkish flowers. Each small flower in the cluster is a narrow tube up to 2 centimeters long which abruptly spreads into a lobed corolla. The fruit is a few millimeters long and has hollow, inflated wings.

References

External links

Jepson Manual Treatment: Abronia turbinata
USDA Plants Profile of Abronia turbinata
Abronia turbinata — UC Photo gallery

turbinata
Flora of California
Flora of Oregon
Flora of Nevada
Flora of the California desert regions
Flora of the Great Basin
Flora without expected TNC conservation status